Lee Gwang-hyeok (born 11 September 1995) is a South Korean footballer who plays as winger for Pohang Steelers. His brother Lee Gwang-hoon is also a footballer.

Career
He joined Pohang Steelers before 2014 season starts.

Career statistics

Club

References

External links 

Lee Gwang-hyeok at steelers.co.kr

1995 births
Living people
Association football wingers
South Korean footballers
Pohang Steelers players
K League 1 players
Sportspeople from Daegu